The 3rd Grand Prix de Caen was a motor race, run to Formula One rules, held on 25 July 1954 at the Circuit de la Prairie, Caen. The race was run over 60 laps of the circuit, and was won by French driver Maurice Trintignant in a Ferrari 625, who started from pole position. British driver Stirling Moss in a Maserati 250F finished a close second and set fastest lap. Gordini driver Jacques Pollet shared third place with Jean Behra after Behra crashed his own car earlier in the race.

Classification

References

Caen Grand Prix
Caen Grand Prix
Caen Grand Prix